Nicolaas Bernard "Nico" Spits (born 7 September 1943) is a retired field hockey player from the Netherlands. He competed  at the 1964 and 1972 Summer Olympics and finished in seventh and fourth place, respectively. In 1972, he played alongside his younger brother, Frans Spits. He was the Olympic flag bearer for the Netherlands in 1972.

Together with his brother he was part of the Dutch team that won the 1973 Men's Hockey World Cup. He is the chairman of Orange All Stars, a club of the former international Dutch athletes who play semiprofessional golf.

References

External links
 

1943 births
Living people
Dutch male field hockey players
Olympic field hockey players of the Netherlands
Field hockey players at the 1964 Summer Olympics
Field hockey players at the 1972 Summer Olympics
Sportspeople from Amstelveen